"Somebody Loves Me" is a popular song, with music written by George Gershwin, and lyrics by Ballard MacDonald and Buddy DeSylva.  The song was published in 1924 and featured in George White's Scandals of 1924.

This is not to be confused with the Southern gospel song written by W.F. & Marjorie Crumley.

The first recordings of "Somebody Loves Me" were a number of popular versions in 1924 and 1925 by Paul Whiteman, Ray Miller, Marion Harris and Cliff Edwards (aka Ukulele Ike) with the Whiteman version being top-rated.

The Four Lads recording
One of the later better-known versions was by The Four Lads. This recording was made on August 18, 1952 and released by Columbia Records as catalog number 39865. It first reached the Billboard magazine charts on October 18, 1952. It peaked at #22 on the charts.

Other recorded versions

Tex Beneke
Margot Bingham
Dave Brubeck
Benny Carter
Sonny Clark
Alma Cogan - recorded in 1952 and included in the CD The A-Z of Alma (1994).
Nat King Cole
Perry Como - included in his album We Get Letters (1957)
Ray Conniff
Bing Crosby - rec. June 14, 1939 - released as Brunswick 02807 in the UK, matrix DLA 1777. A later version was included in his album Some Fine Old Chestnuts (1953).
Vic Damone
Doris Day - recorded in December 1950 for Columbia Records.
Tommy Dorsey
Roy Eldridge
Duke Ellington
Herb Ellis
Percy Faith and his orchestra
Eddie Fisher - included in his album I Love You (1955).
Ella Fitzgerald - Ella Fitzgerald Sings the George and Ira Gershwin Songbook (1959) and her Verve/Polygram release: "Jazz at the Philharmonic, the Ella Fitzgerald Sets".
Helen Forrest
The Four Freshmen - 4 Freshmen and 5 Trombones (1955)
Erroll Garner
George Gershwin
Banu Gibson
Dizzy Gillespie
Jackie Gleason
Johnny Green and his Orchestra - World Program Service transcription 200-5628
Benny Goodman and his orchestra - rec. November 5, 1936 - released as Victor 25497, matrix 02458-1.
Lionel Hampton
Ted Heath
Fletcher Henderson and his orchestra
Ruthie Henshall (1994)
Woody Herman and his orchestra
Lena Horne - rec. June 4, 1943 - from the movie "Broadway Rhythm" (1944)
Alberta Hunter
Dick Hyman
Harry James and his orchestra
Joni James - recorded for her album Joni Sings Sweet (1959).
Bert Kaempfert and his orchestra
Peggy Lee
Oscar Levant
Oscar Peterson
Buddy DeFranco
Guy Lombardo and his Royal Canadians
Julie London - included in the album Julie (1957)
Frankie Lymon and the Teenagers
Maureen McGovern
The McGuire Sisters
Don McLean
Ralph Marterie
Meat Loaf in collaboration with Larry Adler (also 1994)
Melanie
Johnny Mercer
Red Norvo Trio
Isabelle & Tom Patricola - rec. July 23, 1924 - released as Vocalion B 14866, matrix 13513.
Les Paul
Johnny Paycheck
Oscar Peterson - rec. November or December 1952 - released on the LP Oscar Peterson Plays Gershwin (1953).
The Platters - included in their album Remember When? (1959).
Django Reinhardt
Buddy Rich
Maurice Rocco
Dinah Shore - rec. December 10, 1940 - released as Bluebird B10978, matrix BS 058246-1.
Frank Sinatra
Stuff Smith
Aileen Stanley - rec. September 9, 1924 - released as Victor 19454, matrix B-30807-3.
Art Tatum
Bud Powell
Dame Kiri Te Kanawa
Jack Teagarden with Eddie Condon and His Orchestra - rec. December 12, 1944 - released as Decca 23430, matrix 72633.
Dinah Washington - included in The Complete Dinah Washington on Mercury, Vol. 5 (1956-1958).
Paul Weston and his orchestra
Lester Young with Nat King Cole and Buddy Rich - rec. 1946 - released 1951 on a Mercury Records 10 inch LP as The Lester Young Trio
Zoot Sims  1975 with Bucky Pizzarelli gtr, Milt Hinton bs and Buddy Rich drs

Film appearances
Broadway Rhythm (1944) - sung by Lena Horne
Rhapsody in Blue (1945) - performed by Tom Patricola and Joan Leslie (dubbed by Sally Sweetland).
Lullaby of Broadway (1951) - sung by Doris Day and Gene Nelson (dubbed by Hal Derwin)
Somebody Loves Me (1952) - played throughout the film and sung at the end by Betty Hutton and Ralph Meeker
Pete Kelly's Blues (1955) - sung by Peggy Lee

See also 
List of 1920s jazz standards

References 

Songs with music by George Gershwin
Songs with lyrics by Ballard MacDonald
Songs with lyrics by Buddy DeSylva
1924 songs
1920s jazz standards